This is a list of the largest optical telescopes in North America.

21st century
A list of optical telescopes located in North America by aperture.

Refractors
Some of the big traditional refractors (telescope with lens) in North America:

Biggest telescopes in 1950
Optical telescopes only

Biggest telescopes in 1900

Biggest telescopes in 1850
Some of the largest at observatories:

See also
Lists of telescopes
List of radio telescopes
List of largest optical reflecting telescopes (mirrors)
List of largest optical refracting telescopes (lenses)

References

External links
US Telescopes (1989)

Lists of telescopes
Telescopes
Optical telescopes